Senator James may refer to:

Members of the United States Senate
Charles Tillinghast James (1805–1862), U.S. Senator from Rhode Island from 1851 to 1857
Ollie Murray James (1871–1918), U.S. Senator from Kentucky from 1913 to 1918

United States state senate members
Addison James (1849–1910), Kentucky State Senate
David James (American politician) (1843–1921), Wisconsin State Senate
Donzella James (born 1948), Georgia State Senate
Francis James (congressman) (1799–1886), Pennsylvania State Senate
G. Luz A. James (died 2006), Senate of the U.S. Virgin Islands
Gerard Luz James (born 1953), Senate of the U.S. Virgin Islands
John Hough James (1800–1881), Ohio State Senate
John M. James (fl. 1860s), California State Senate
Lorenzo James (1805–1888), Alabama State Senate
Norman L. James (1840–1918), Wisconsin State Senate
Rorer A. James (1859–1921), Virginia State Senate
Sharpe James (born 1936), New Jersey State Senate
W. Frank James (1873–1945), Michigan State Senate
William S. James (1914–1993), Maryland State Senate